Magnus was a Belgian joint dance music project comprising Tom Barman (from the rock band dEUS) and CJ Bolland. Magnus' debut album, The Body Gave You Everything, was released on 29 March 2004. Four of its tracks were released as singles: "Summer's Here", "Jumpneedle", "French Movies" and "Hunter/Collector".

"Summer's Here" (which uses a sample of Donald Byrd's song "Christo Redentor") and "Rhythm Is Deified" also appeared on the soundtrack of Barman's 2003 film Any Way the Wind Blows. In the years following their debut album, Tom Barman and CJ Bolland performed together as DJs on several festivals.

After a long hiatus, the band released a second album in 2014 titled Where Neon Goes to Die. It was preceded by the single "Singing Man", with vocals by Tom Smith, leader of Editors. Other guest vocalists on the album included David Eugene Edwards, Selah Sue, Mina Tindle, Tim Vanhamel, Billie Kawende and Portuguese female rap artist Blaya. Briefly after the release of the album, an alternate version of "Singing Man" was recorded with Mark Lanegan.

In December 2014, Magnus released "Slecht Gaan", a collaboration with Dutch rap act De Jeugd Van Tegenwoordig which was not featured on Where Neon Goes to Die.

Albums

Singles and EPs

External links
 Official website

Belgian electronic music groups
Belgian dance music groups
Belgian musical duos